The Ten Commandments of Computer Ethics were created in 1992 by the Washington, D.C. based Computer Ethics Institute. The commandments were introduced in the paper "In Pursuit of a 'Ten Commandments' for Computer Ethics" by Ramon C. Barquin as a means to create "a set of standards to guide and instruct people in the ethical use of computers." They follow the Internet Advisory Board's memo on ethics from 1987.  The Ten Commandments of Computer Ethics copies the archaic style of the Ten Commandments from the King James Bible.

The commandments have been widely quoted in computer ethics literature but also have been criticized by both the hacker community and some in academia. For instance, Dr. Ben Fairweather of the "Centre for Computing and Social Responsibility" has described them as "simplistic" and overly restrictive.

ISC2, one of the thought leaders in the information security industry, has referred to the commandments in developing its own ethics rules.

The Ten Commandments of Computer Ethics
  Thou shalt not use a computer to harm other people.
  Thou shalt not interfere with other people's computer work.
  Thou shalt not snoop around in other people's computer files.
  Thou shalt not use a computer to steal.
  Thou shalt not use a computer to bear false witness.
  Thou shalt not copy or use proprietary software for which you have not paid (without permission).
  Thou shalt not use other people's computer resources without authorization or proper compensation.
  Thou shalt not appropriate other people's intellectual output.
  Thou shalt think about the social consequences of the program you are writing or the system you are designing.
  Thou shalt always use a computer in ways that ensure consideration and respect for other humans.

Exegesis 
 Commandment 1: Thou shalt not use a computer to harm other people.
 Simply put: Do not use the computer in ways that may harm other people.
 Explanation: This commandment says that it is unethical to use a computer to harm another user. It is not limited to physical injury. It includes harming or corrupting other users' data or files. The commandment states that it is wrong to use a computer to steal someone's personal information. Manipulating or destroying files of other users is ethically wrong. It is unethical to write programs, which on execution lead to stealing, copying or gaining unauthorized access to other users' data. Being involved in practices like hacking, spamming, phishing or cyber bullying does not conform to computer ethics.
 Commandment 2: Thou shalt not interfere with other people's computer work.
 Simply put: Do not use computer technology to cause interference in other users' work.
 Explanation: Computer software can be used in ways that disturb other users or disrupt their work. Viruses, for example, are programs meant to harm useful computer programs or interfere with the normal functioning of a computer. Malicious software can disrupt the functioning of computers in more ways than one. It may overload computer memory through excessive consumption of computer resources, thus slowing its functioning. It may cause a computer to function wrongly or even stop working. Using malicious software to attack a computer is unethical.
 Commandment 3: Thou shalt not snoop around in other people's computer files.
 Simply put: Do not spy on another person's computer data.
 Explanation: We know it is wrong to read someone's personal letters. On the same lines, it is wrong to read someone else's email messages or files. Obtaining data from another person's private files is nothing less than breaking into someone's room. Snooping around in another person's files or reading someone else's personal messages is the invasion of his privacy. There are exceptions to this. For example, spying is necessary and cannot be called unethical when it is done against illegitimate use of computers. For example, intelligence agencies working on cybercrime cases need to spy on the internet activity of suspects.
 Commandment 4: Thou shalt not use a computer to steal.
 Simply put: Do not use computer technology to steal information.
 Explanation: Stealing sensitive information or leaking confidential information is as good as robbery. It is wrong to acquire personal information of employees from an employee database or patient history from a hospital database or other such information that is meant to be confidential. Similarly, breaking into a bank account to collect information about the account or account holder is wrong. Illegal electronic transfer of funds is a type of fraud. With the use of technology, stealing of information is much easier. Computers can be used to store stolen information.
 Commandment 5: Thou shalt not use a computer to bear false witness.
 Simply put: Do not contribute to the spread of misinformation using computer technology.
 Explanation: Spread of information has become viral today, because of the Internet. This also means that false news or rumors can spread speedily through social networking sites or emails. Being involved in the circulation of incorrect information is unethical. Mails and pop-ups are commonly used to spread the wrong information or give false alerts with the only intent of selling products. Mails from untrusted sources advertising certain products or spreading some hard-to-believe information, are not uncommon. Direct or indirect involvement in the circulation of false information is ethically wrong. Giving wrong information can hurt other parties or organizations that are affected by that particular theme.
 Commandment 6: Thou shalt not copy or use proprietary software for which you have not paid (without permission).
 Simply put: Refrain from copying software or buying pirated copies. Pay for software unless it is free.
 Explanation: Like any other artistic or literary work, software is copyrighted. A piece of code is the original work of the individual who created it. It is copyrighted in his/her name. In case of a developer writing software for the organization she works for, the organization holds the copyright for it. Copyright holds true unless its creators announce it is not. Obtaining illegal copies of copyrighted software is unethical and also encourages others to make copies illegally.
 Commandment 7: Thou shalt not use other people's computer resources without authorization or proper compensation.
 Simply put: Do not use someone else's computer resources unless authorized to.
 Explanation: Multi-user systems have user specific passwords. Breaking into some other user's password, thus intruding his/her private space is unethical. It is not ethical to hack passwords for gaining unauthorized access to a password-protected computer system. Accessing data that you are not authorized to access or gaining access to another user's computer without her permission is not ethical.
 Commandment 8: Thou shalt not appropriate other people's intellectual output.
 Simply put: It is wrong to claim ownership on a work which is the output of someone else's intellect.
 Explanation: Programs developed by a software developer are her property. If he is working with an organization, they are the organization's property. Copying them and propagating them in one's own name is unethical. This applies to any creative work, program or design. Establishing ownership on a work which is not yours is ethically wrong. 
 Commandment 9: Thou shalt think about the social consequences of the program you are writing or the system you are designing.
 Simply put: Before developing a software, think about the social impact it can have.
 Explanation: Looking at the social consequences that a program can have, describes a broader perspective of looking at technology. A computer software on release, reaches millions. Software like video games and animations or educational software can have a social impact on their users. When working on animation films or designing video games, for example, it is the programmer's responsibility to understand his target audience/users and the effect it may have on them. For example, a computer game for kids should not have content that can influence them negatively. Similarly, writing malicious software is ethically wrong. A software developer/development firm should consider the influence their code can have on the society at large.
 Commandment 10: Thou shalt always use a computer in ways that ensure consideration and respect for other humans.
 Simply put: In using computers for communication, be respectful and courteous with the fellow members.
 Explanation: The communication etiquette we follow in the real world applies to communication over computers as well. While communicating over the Internet, one should treat others with respect. One should not intrude others' private space, use abusive language, make false statements or pass irresponsible remarks about others. One should be courteous while communicating over the web and should respect others' time and resources. Also, one should be considerate with a novice computer user.

References

External links 
 The Ten Commandments of Computer Ethics listed at Computer Professionals for Social Responsibility
 Centre for Computing and Social Responsibility

Computing and society
Ethics of science and technology
Professional ethics
Codes of conduct
1992 documents
Internet ethics
it:I dieci comandamenti dell'etica del computer